Rémy Désilets is a Quebec, Canada politician.  He was a Member of the National Assembly.

Background

He was born on December 27, 1952, in Drummondville, Centre-du-Québec and is an educator.

Political career

Désilets ran as a Parti Québécois candidate in the provincial district of Maskinongé in 1994 and won.  He succeeded Liberal incumbent Yvon Picotte who had just retired from politics.

He was re-elected in 1998 and served as Parliamentary Assistant from 2002 to 2003.

In 2003, he lost re-election against Liberal candidate Francine Gaudet.

He attempted a political comeback in 2007, but finished third, behind winner Jean Damphousse from the Action Démocratique du Québec and Gaudet who was running for re-election.

Controversy
Désilets courted controversy in 2016 through an illegal contribution to a colleague's campaign fund, for which he was fined C$6,000.

References

See also 

Politics of Quebec
Quebec general elections
Quebec Liberal Party

1952 births
Living people
Parti Québécois MNAs
People from Drummondville
Canadian truck drivers
21st-century Canadian politicians